Ülle Kukk (born 18 November 1937 in Tartu) is an Estonian botanist and conservationist.

Education and career
She was born in Tartu and graduated from the University of Tartu in 1960. 1960–1962 she continued to work in the university and also in the Institute of Experimental Biology of the Academy of Sciences of the Estonian SSR.

From 1965 to 1975 she worked as a member of the research staff at the Tallinn Botanic Garden.

Research
Kukk's research has addressed Estonian protected plants and indigenous ornamental plants, and she has been engaged in the distribution of rare and protected plants, biology, monitoring and protection.

She is one of the founders and a board member of the Estonian Orchid Protection Club.

Kukk is a member of the Berne Convention's Expert Group on flora, and she was a co-author of the "Estonian Red Book" established in 1998.

Personal
She was married to phycologist and conservationist Erich Kukk (1928–2017).

Selected publications
 (English version published by Light: New York)

References

20th-century Estonian botanists
1937 births
Living people
Scientists from Tartu
University of Tartu alumni
Academic staff of the Estonian University of Life Sciences
21st-century Estonian botanists